William Thomas McCann Sr. (September 23, 1919 – July 27, 2002) was an American college basketball coach. He served as head basketball coach at Hampden–Sydney College, Washington and Lee University and the University of Virginia.

McCann played basketball and baseball at Virginia. Following his college playing career, he became a high school coach and worked his way up to head coaching positions at Hampden–Sydney and Washington and Lee. He then was named head coach at Virginia in the Atlantic Coast Conference (ACC) in 1957. McCann resigned after the 1962–63 season. His record at Virginia was 40–106.

McCann died on July 27, 2002 at age 82.

Head coaching record

References

External links
 Coaching record @ sports-reference.com

1919 births
2002 deaths
American men's basketball coaches
American men's basketball players
Basketball coaches from Virginia
Basketball players from Richmond, Virginia
College men's basketball head coaches in the United States
Hampden–Sydney Tigers basketball coaches
High school basketball coaches in the United States
Virginia Cavaliers baseball players
Virginia Cavaliers men's basketball coaches
Virginia Cavaliers men's basketball players
Washington and Lee Generals men's basketball coaches